Grawitz is a surname. Notable people with the surname include:

 Ernst Grawitz (hematologist) (1860–1911), German internist
 Ernst-Robert Grawitz (1899–1945), Nazi physician
 Paul Grawitz (1850–1932), physician who identified the Grawitz tumor
 Grawitz tumor, Renal cell carcinoma